Hamish Vigne Christie "Korky" Paul (born 1951) is a British illustrator of children's books. He was born and raised in Rhodesia, but now lives in Oxford, England. His work, characteristically executed with bright watercolour paint and pen and ink, is recognisable by an anarchic yet detailed style and for its "wild characterisation". He is most known for his illustration of the series Winnie the Witch.

Biography 

Paul was born in 1951 into a family of seven children in Salisbury, Southern Rhodesia (now Harare, Zimbabwe) where he had what he calls "a wild and privileged childhood" in the African Bushveld.

He went to Estcourt High School before graduating from Durban School of Art in 1972 and working at an advertising agency in Cape Town. In 1976 he travelled to Greece where he met James Watt, then working for a Greek publisher who commissioned Paul to illustrate a series of educational books teaching Greek children to speak the 'Queen's English'.

He then spent some time working in an advertising agency in London and Los Angeles, and then studied film animation under Jules Engel at California Institute of the Arts in Valencia, California. His first children's book was a pop-up called The Crocodile and the Dumper Truck published in 1980, with paper engineering by Ray Marshall.

In 1986 Paul met the editor, Ron Heapy, at Oxford University Press, who looked at his work and commissioned him to draw several pictures for a short book about a witch written by Valerie Thomas as part of OUP's Reading Tree programme. Paul liked the story enough to turn it into a complete picture book. Although this was not strictly within Paul's brief, Heapy nevertheless presented it to the OUP delegates.  The resulting book, Winnie the Witch, went on to win the Red House Children's Book Award in 1988 and has since been published in over 10 languages. Paul's illustrations for this are full of visual jokes and witty detail. Since then he has illustrated a further nineteen Winnie the Witch titles that have sold over 7 million copies.

Of Paul's contribution to the success of Winnie and Wilbur, Helen Mortimer of OUP writes, "Winnie is such a loved character. It's partly because the artwork is so distinctive and detailed; there is so much to pour over in every single spread." Of his illustration of Winnie in the books, Paul told the Telegraph: "I didn't want witchy colours... I love throwing in colour, it makes me feel like Jackson Pollock."

Three of Paul's picture books have been adapted for CD-ROM; The Fish Who Could Wish which won the European Multi-Media Award (EMMA) in 1995, Dragon Poems and Winnie the Witch.

His anarchic yet detailed work, executed with bright watercolour paint and pen and ink, is distinguished by its "wild characterisation". It has been compared to Tom and Jerry cartoons, and also to the artists Ronald Searle and Ralph Steadman.
He has original artwork on display at The Mazza Collection Galleria, University of Findlay, Findlay, Ohio, US.

Paul lives in Oxford and is married to the artist Susan Moxley. Together they have two children, Oska and Zoë.

Describing the technical details of his work he says: "I use an Apple Mac, Schminke watercolours, Caran d'Ache pencil crayons (with electric sharpener), Saunders Waterford paper 190gm3 , black kandahar and coloured inks with a dip pen, toothbrush, porcupine quills, and my trusty left hand."

In 2015/2016, he was the 7th most borrowed illustrator in UK public libraries.

Partial bibliography

Written and Illustrated 
The Big Book (Methuen) 1985
The Fat Book (Methuen) 1985
The Thin Book (Methuen) 1985
 The Coconut Feast, Orbis (London, England), 1985.
 Adventures with the Creep, Orbis (London, England), 1985.
 The Special Romance, Orbis (London, England), 1985.
 The Fruit Salad Tangle, Orbis (London, England), 1985.
Billy Bumps Builds a Palace (Oxford University Press) 1995

Illustrated

Winnie the Witch 
Valerie Thomas, Winnie the Witch (Kane/Miller) 1987, winner of the Children's Book Award
Valerie Thomas, Winnie in Winter (Oxford University Press) 1996, shortlisted for the Children's Book Award
Valerie Thomas, Winnie Flies Again (Oxford University Press) 1999
Valerie Thomas, Winnie's Magic Wand (Oxford University Press) 2002
Valerie Thomas, Winnie's New Computer (Oxford University Press) 2003
 2005 Winnie at the Seaside
 2006 Winnie's Midnight Dragon
 Valerie Thomas, Happy Birthday Winnie (Oxford University Press) 2008
 2008 Winnie's Flying Carpet
 2009 Winnie's Amazing Pumpkin
 2010 Winnie in Space
 2011 Winnie Under the Sea
 2012 Winnie's Dinosaur Day
 2013 Winnie`s Pirate Adventure
 2014 Winnie`s Big Bad Robot
 2015 Winnie's Haunted House
 Valerie Thomas, Winnie and Wilbur in Space (OUP) 2016
 2016 Winnie & Wilbur Meet Santa
 2017 Winnie & Wilbur and the Naughty Knight

Others 
Ray Marshall, Sara Sharpe, The Crocodile and the Dumper Truck: A Reptilian Guide to London (Atheneum) 1982
Ray Marshall, Cats Up: Purring Pop-Ups (Little Simon) 1982
Ray Marshall, Doors (Dutton) 1982
Ray Marshall, Hey Diddle Diddle (Little Simon) 1983
Ray Marshall, Humpty Dumpty (Little Simon)  1983
Ray Marshall, Jack and Jill (Little Simon) 1983
Ray Marshall, Sing a Song of Sixpence (Little Simon) 1983
John Bush, This Is a Book about Baboons (Kestrel) 1983
John Bush, This Is a Book about Giraffes (Kestrel) 1983
John Bush, This Is a Book about Hippos (Kestrel) 1983
Ray Marshall, Pop-Up Numbers (Dutton) 1984
Ray Marshall, Pop-Up Addition (Kestrel) 1984
Ray Marshall, Pop-Up Subtraction (Kestrel) 1984
Ray Marshall, Pop-Up Multiplication (Kestrel) 1984
Ray Marshall, Pop-Up Division (Kestrel) 1984
Keren Kristal, The Brainbox, (Methuen) 1986
Peter Carter, Captain Teachum's Buried Treasure (Oxford University Press) 1989, shortlisted for the Kate Greenaway Medal
Tessa Dahl, Gwenda and the Animals (Hamish Hamilton) 1989
Tandi Jackson, The Wonderhair Restorer (Heinemann) 1990
John Foster, Never Say Boo to a Ghost (Oxford University Press) 1990
Tessa Dahl, School Can Wait (Hamish Hamilton) 1990
Stephen Wyllie, Dinner with Fox (Dial) 1990
John Bush, The Fish Who Could Wish, (Kane/Miller) 1991
The Pop-Up Book of Ghost Tales (Harcourt) 1991
John Foster, Dragon Poems (Oxford University Press) 1991
Robin Tzannes, Professor Puffendorf's Secret Potions, (Oxford University Press) 1992
Jonathan Long, The Dog That Dug, (Bodley Head) 1992, shortlisted for the Kate Greenaway Medal
Shen Roddie, Mrs. Wolf (Tango) 1992
Robin Tzannes, The Great Robbery (Tango) 1993
Robin Tzannes, Sanji and the Baker, (Oxford University Press) 1993
John Foster, compiler, Dinosaur Poems (Oxford University Press) 1993
Robin Tzannes, Mookie Goes Fishing (Oxford University Press) 1994
Jonathan Long, The Cat That Scratched (Bodley Head) 1994
Jeanne Willis, The Rascally Cake, (Andersen Press) (London, England), 1994, winner of the Children's Book Award
Peter Tabern, Pirates, (Andersen Press) 1994
Peter Tabern, Blood and Thunder (Andersen Press) 1994
Peter Harris, Have You Seen Max? (Aladdin) 1994
Michel Piquemal, The Monster Book of Horrible Horrors, translated by Peter Haswell, (Bodley Head) 1995
John Foster, compiler, Monster Poems (Oxford University Press) 1995
Jonathan Long, The Duck That Had No Luck (Bodley Head) 1996, shortlisted for the Kate Greenaway Medal
Julianna Bethlen, Dracula Junior and the Fake Fangs, paper engineering by Richard Ferguson (Dial) 1996
John Foster, compiler, Magic Poems (Oxford University Press) 1997
Vivian French, reteller, Aesop's Funky Fables (Hamish Hamilton) 1997
John Foster, compiler, Dragons, Dinosaurs, and Monster Poems (Oxford University Press) 1998
John Agard, Brer Rabbit: The Great Tug-o-War, (Barron's Educational) 1998
Teresa Lynch, Call Me Sam, (Oxford University Press) 1998.
W. J. Corbett, The Battle of Chinnbrook Wood, (Hodder) 1998
Jonathan Long, The Wonkey Donkey (Bodley Head) 1999
Michael Rosen, Lunch Boxes Don't Fly, (Puffin Books) 1999
John Foster, compiler, Pet Poems (Oxford University Press) 2000
Vivian French, reteller, Funky Tales (Hamish Hamilton) 2000
Michael Rosen, Uncle Billy Being Silly (Puffin Books) 2001
John Foster, compiler, Fantastic Football Poems (Oxford University) 2001
Michael Rosen, No Breathing in Class (Puffin Books) 2002
Paul Rogers, Tiny (Bodley Head) 2002
Mary Arrigan, Pa Jinglebob: The Fastest Knitter in the West (Egmont) 2002
Jon Blake, The Deadly Secret of Dorothy W. (Hodder) 2003
Giles Andreae, Sir Scallywag and the Golden Underpants (Oxford University Press) 2012

Paul has also illustrated books for The Prison Phoenix Trust, sent to prisoners free of charge:
 Freeing the Spirit through Meditation and Yoga by Sandy Chubb and Sister Elaine MacInnes, 2005
 Yoga Without Words by Sandy Chubb and Jo Child, 2008

News articles

See also

References

External links 
 
Winnie the Witch website at Oxford University Press
Oxford Children's Book Group, a local charity for whom Paul has illustrated

1951 births
Artists from Harare
Artists from Oxford
Living people
British children's book illustrators
British illustrators
Oxford University Press people
Rhodesian expatriates in the United Kingdom
Southern Rhodesian expatriates
Date of birth missing (living people)